Hirasea planulata is a species of small air-breathing land snail, a terrestrial pulmonate gastropod mollusc in the family Endodontidae.

This species is extinct.

Distribution
This species was endemic to Japan.

References

Endodontidae
Extinct gastropods
Extinct animals of Japan
Taxonomy articles created by Polbot